Penglai Pavilion or Penglai Pagoda is a famous tower in Penglai, Shandong. It is noted as one of the Four Great Towers of China, although it is occasionally not listed due to lacking a famous literary piece associated with it. It is known as the landing place of the Eight Immortals and famous for its occasional mirages. The dividing line between the Yellow Sea and Bohai Sea is also marked and clearly visible from the area. The corresponding tourism area is classified as a AAAAA scenic area by the China National Tourism Administration.

Warlord Zhang Zongchang wrote an (in)famous poem ("Visiting Pengai Pavilion") about the pavilion's beauty.

References

Towers in China
Major National Historical and Cultural Sites in Shandong
AAAAA-rated tourist attractions
Yantai
Traditional Chinese architecture